Borås or Boras may refer to:

People
Scott Boras (born 1952) is an American sports agent, specializing in baseball

Places

Norway
Borås, Norway, a village in the municipality of Arendal in Agder county

Sweden
Borås, a city and the seat of Borås Municipality in Västra Götaland county
Borås Municipality, a municipality in Västra Götaland county
Borås Arena, a football stadium in the city of Borås
University of Borås, a university college in the city of Borås

Sports
Borås Basket, a professional basketball club based in the Swedish town of Borås
Borås AIK, a Swedish football club located in Borås
KFUM Borås, a Swedish multi-sport club based in Borås
Borås Ishall, an indoor arena located in Borås, Sweden
Borås HC, a Swedish professional ice hockey club, based in Borås

Other
Borås Djurpark, a zoo in the northern part of central Borås in Sweden
Borås Tidning, a Swedish-language daily newspaper published in Borås, Sweden